Symphony of Enchanted Lands is the second studio album released by Rhapsody in 1998, and is also the second part of the Emerald Sword Saga.

Track listing

Personnel

Band members
Fabio Lione - lead & backing vocals
Luca Turilli - electric & acoustic guitars, part of the choirs
Alex Staropoli - keyboards, harpsichord, piano, part of the choirs
Alessandro Lotta - bass
Daniele Carbonera - drums and percussion

Guest musicians
Sascha Paeth - acoustic guitars, mandolin, balalaika
Don Kosaken - Russian choirs 
Helmstedter Kammerchor, conducted by Andreas Lamken - sacred choirs
Thomas Rettke, Robert Hunecke-Rizzo, Ricky Rizzo, Cinzia Rizzo, Tatiana Bloch, Davide Calabrese, Michele Mayer, Giuliano Tarlon, Cristiano Adacher, Manuel Staropoli - choirs
Constanze Backes - female baroque voice on "Symphony of Enchanted Lands" 
Sir Jay Lansford - Narrator spoken parts
Erik Steenbock - marching drums 
Manuel Staropoli - baroque recorders & baroque oboe 
Matthias Brommann - lead violin 
Claas Harders - viola da gamba 
Ulrike Wildenhof, Almut Schlicker, Stefanie Holk, Friedrike Bauer, Matthias Brommann - violins
Marie-Theres Strumpf, Cosima Bergk, Jan Larsen - violas 
Hagen Kuhr - cello 
Andre Neygenfind - contrabass 
Stefan Horz - harpsichord

Production
Produced by Sascha Paeth and Miro.
Engineered, mixed and mastered by Sascha Paeth and Miro at Gate Studio in Wolfsburg, Germany
All Artwork by: Eric Philippe
Photography by: Karsten Koch, Hannover

Charts

References

External links 
 Lyrics

1998 albums
Rhapsody of Fire albums
Limb Music albums